Centre Township is a township in Berks County, Pennsylvania. The population was 4,140 at the 2020 census. It is in Schuylkill Valley School District.

History
Belleman's Union Church was listed on the National Register of Historic Places in 1973.

Geography

Adjacent townships
Upper Bern Township (northwest)
Tilden Township (north)
Perry Township (northeast)
Ontelaunee Township (southeast)
Bern Township (south)
Penn Township (west)
Adjacent boroughs
Centerport (surrounded)
Shoemakersville (northeast)
Leesport (southeast)

Demographics

At the 2000 census, there were 4,036 people, 1,511 households, and 1,157 families living in the township. The population density was 186.9 people per square mile.  There were 1,570 housing units at an average density of 72.7/sq mi .  The racial makeup of the township was 97.4% White, 0.8% African American, 0.1% Native American, 0.5% Asian, 0.9% from other races, and 0.4% from two or more races. Hispanic or Latino of any race were 2.5%.

There were 1,511 households, 29.5% had children under the age of 18 living with them, 66.9% were married couples living together, 5.1% had a female householder with no husband present, and 23.4% were non-families. 17.9% of households were made up of individuals, and 7.5% were one person aged 65 or older.  The average household size was 2.67 and the average family size was 3.03.

The age distribution was 23.2% under the age of 18, 6.8% from 18 to 24, 24.1% from 25 to 44, 33.5% from 45 to 64, and 12.4% 65 or older.  The median age was 43 years. Males made up 51.4% of the population and females made up 48.6%.

The median household income was $51,698 and the median family income  was $58,056. Males had a median income of $36,972 versus $25,701 for females. The per capita income for the township was $20,718.  About 4.1% of families and 5.6% of the population were below the poverty line, including 4.9% of those under age 18 and 6.5% of those age 65 or over.

Transportation

No numbered highways serve Centre Township directly. Main thoroughfares in the township include Bellemans Church Road, Berne Road, Boundary Road, Garfield Road, Irish Creek Road, Main Street, Shartlesville Road, Shoey Road and Tilden Road. The nearest state highway is Pennsylvania Route 61, which passes just east of the township.

References

External links

Townships in Berks County, Pennsylvania
Townships in Pennsylvania